The Mormaer or Earl of Menteith was the ruler of the province of Menteith in the Middle Ages. The first mormaer is usually regarded as Gille Críst (or Gilchrist), simply because he is the earliest on record. The title was held in a continuous line from Gille Críst until Muireadhach IV (a.k.a. Murdoch Stewart, Duke of Albany), although the male line was broken on two occasions. A truncated version of the earldom was given two years later to Malise Graham, 1st Earl of Menteith, in compensation for loss of the Earldom of Strathearn, which was a likely result of the execution of the Duke of Albany.

List of holders

First line of mormaers/earls

Gille Críst, Earl of Menteith (Gilcrist) (d. 1189)
Muireadhach I, Earl of Menteith (d. 1213)
Muireadhach II, Earl of Menteith (d. 1234)
Isabella, Countess of Menteith
m. Walter Comyn, Lord of Badenoch assumed the peerage in her right.
Mary I, Countess of Menteith
m. Walter "Bailloch" Stewart

Second line, Stewarts of Menteith
Alexander, Earl of Menteith  
Alan, Earl of Menteith
Alan II, Earl of Menteith
Muireadhach III, Earl of Menteith  (d. 1332)
Mary Menteith, Countess of Menteith
m. Sir John Graham assumed the peerage in her right.
Margaret, Countess of Menteith 
m. Robert Stewart, Duke of Albany 
Muireadhach IV Stewart, Earl of Menteith, executed in 1425 and the peerages forfeited.

Third line, Grahams of Menteith
Malise Graham, 1st Earl of Menteith (1406–1490) 
Alexander Graham, 2nd Earl of Menteith (c. 1475–c. 1537)
William Graham, 3rd Earl of Menteith (c. 1500–c. 1543)
John Graham, 4th Earl of Menteith (c. 1529–c. 1565)
William Graham, 5th Earl of Menteith (c. 1555–c. 1578)
John Graham, 6th Earl of Menteith (c. 1571–c. 1598)  
William Graham, 7th Earl of Menteith (c. 1591–1661), also created Earl of Airth in 1633
William Graham, 8th Earl of Menteith (c. 1634–1694), extinct or dormant after his death on 12 September 1694

See also
Stuart-Menteth Baronets 
The Stuart-Menteth Baronetcy, of Closeburn in the County of Dumfries and Mansfield in the County of Ayr, is a title in the Baronetage of the United Kingdom. It was created on 11 August 1838 for Charles Stuart-Menteth. The Stuart-Menteth family traces its descent from Walter Comyn (third son of Walter Comyn, Justiciar of Scotia), who in 1258 married Isabella, Countess of Menteith (or Menteth).

References

 Paul, James Balfour, The Scots Peerage, Vol. VI, (Edinburgh, 1909)
 Roberts, John L., Lost Kingdoms: Celtic Scotland in the Middle Ages, (Edinburgh, 1997), p. 52
 Clan Campbell Society of North America CCSNA.org, information on the Macoran sept that began in the latter half of the 17th century under the protection of the Earl of Menteith, who later gave this young Campbell of Melfort a farm at Inchanoch.  That Macoran / Campbell married a Miss Haldane, niece of Haldane of Lanrick, and the family prospered.

Extinct earldoms in the Peerage of Scotland
 
History of the Scottish Highlands
People associated with Stirling (council area)
History of Stirling (council area)
Dormant earldoms in the Peerage of Scotland
Clan Graham